The Gulf Fall and Uplands, an interim Australian bioregion, is located in the Northern Territory and Queensland, comprising .

Described in IBRA5.1 as "undulating terrain with scattered low, steep hills on Proterozoic and Palaeozoic sedimentary rocks, often overlain by lateritised Tertiary material; skeletal soils and shallow sands; Darwin box (Eucalyptus tectifica) and variable-barked bloodwood (Corymbia erythrophloia) woodland to low open woodland with spinifex understorey."

The abbreviation for the bioregion is GFU.

See also

Geography of Australia

References

Further reading
 Thackway, R and I D Cresswell (1995) An interim biogeographic regionalisation for Australia : a framework for setting priorities in the National Reserves System Cooperative Program Version 4.0 Canberra : Australian Nature Conservation Agency, Reserve Systems Unit, 1995. 

Carpentaria tropical savanna
IBRA regions